The 1930 VMI Keydets football team was an American football team that represented the Virginia Military Institute (VMI) during the 1930 college football season as a member of the Southern Conference. In their fourth year under head coach W. C. Raftery, the team compiled an overall record of 3–6.

Schedule

References

VMI
VMI Keydets football seasons
VMI Keydets football